Sri Lanka competed at the 2017 Asian Indoor and Martial Arts Games in Ashgabat, Turkmenistan from 17 to 27 September 2017.

Sri Lanka finished on 26th place for winning the most medals among other nations at the 2017 Asian Indoor and Martial Arts Games.

Participants

Medallists

References 

Nations at the 2017 Asian Indoor and Martial Arts Games
2017 in Sri Lankan sport